Kahriz-e Salah ol Din (also Romanized as Kahrīz-e Şalāḩ ol Dīn and Kahrīz-e Şalāḩ od Dīn; also known as Kahrīz and Kārīz) is a village in Khezel-e Sharqi Rural District, Khezel District, Nahavand County, Hamadan Province, Iran. At the 2006 census, its population was 1,033, in 263 families.

References 

Populated places in Nahavand County